Auspicius may refer to one of several Catholic saints:

Auspicius of Apt, traditionally given as the first bishop of Apt, end of 1st century, said to have preserved the relics of Saint Anne
Auspicius of Toul, bishop of Toul at the end of the fifth century
Auspicius of Trier, Archbishop of Trier c. 131, who is perhaps to be identified with Auspicius of Toul